Joaquin Pinto (born 25 February 1961) is a Colombian fencer. He competed in the individual and team épée events at the 1988 Summer Olympics.

References

1961 births
Living people
Colombian male épée fencers
Olympic fencers of Colombia
Fencers at the 1988 Summer Olympics
Pan American Games medalists in fencing
Pan American Games bronze medalists for Colombia
Fencers at the 1987 Pan American Games
20th-century Colombian people
21st-century Colombian people